The Phuket Range  (Thio Khao Phuket) is a subrange of the Tenasserim Hills in the Kra Isthmus, Thailand.

Geography
The Phuket chain is a continuation of the greater Tenasserim range, forming one of the southern sections of the central Indo-Malay cordillera, the mountain chain which runs from Tibet through all of the Malay peninsula extending southwards for over 200 km. The Nakhon Si Thammarat Range begins 60 km to the east of the southern part of the Phuket Range. Between the ranges there are isolated peaks rising from the lowlands, the highest of which is 1,350 m high Khao Phanom Bencha near Krabi.

The highest elevation is Khao Langkha Tuek with an elevation of 1395 m. As the hills raise directly from the western coast there are no notable rivers west of the ridge. To the east the largest rivers are the Phum Duang River and the Lang Suan River.

The largest lake within the mountains is the Chiao Lan (Ratchaprapha dam) at 165 km2, an artificial lake within the Khao Sok National Park. The mountains mostly consist of limestone, which leads to the karst geography of steep hills. The hills west of the ridge contain several tin mines, mostly exhausted.

Protection
The range is in the Tenasserim-South Thailand semi-evergreen rain forests ecoregion. Most of the mountains are protected in various national parks and other protected areas. These are (from the south) Si Phang-nga NP, Ton Pariwat Wildlife Sanctuary, Khlong Phanom NP, Khao Sok NP, Khlong Yan Wildlife Sanctuary, Kaeng Krung NP, Khlong Nakha Wildlife Sanctuary and Namtok Ngao NP (formerly named Khlong Phrao NP).

References

External links
Geography of the Kra river area (Thai)

Tenasserim Hills
Mountain ranges of Thailand
Malay Peninsula
Kra Isthmus
Southern Thailand